Nina Bohm (born 30 April 1958) is a former professional tennis player from Sweden.

Biography
Bohm, a right-handed player from Stockholm, made her Fed Cup debut for Sweden in 1978, against France. She appeared in a total of four ties, the other three coming in 1980, where she and partner Helena Anliot won deciding doubles rubbers against France and Japan, before Sweden fell to Australia in the quarter-finals.

During her professional career she competed in the main draw of all four grand slam events. She made the fourth round of the 1981 French Open, with wins over Renáta Tomanová and 14th seed Ivanna Madruga. At the 1981 Wimbledon Championships she was a quarter-finalist in the women's doubles, partnering American Sherry Acker. She also reached the third round of the singles draw that year, where she lost 6–8 in third set against eighth seed Virginia Ruzici.

References

External links
 
 
 

1958 births
Living people
Swedish female tennis players
Tennis players from Stockholm
20th-century Swedish women
21st-century Swedish women